Amt Biesenthal-Barnim is an Amt ("collective municipality") in the district of Barnim, in Brandenburg, Germany. Its seat is in the town Biesenthal.

The Amt Biesenthal-Barnim consists of the following municipalities:
Biesenthal
Breydin
Marienwerder
Melchow
Rüdnitz
Sydower Fließ

Demography

References

biesenthal-Barnim
Barnim